Leutnant Hermann Pfeiffer (24 July 1890 – 20 May 1917) IC was a German World War I flying ace credited with eleven aerial victories.

World War I military service

Pfeiffer joined the German army on 1 October 1913. He rose to Unteroffizier in the 114th Bavarian Infantry Regiment. He won an Iron Cross Second Class in May 1915. He then transferred to aviation, and in July, he began pilot training. Once qualified, he was posted to Feldflieger Abteilung 110, where he was promoted to Vizefeldwebel on 11 July 1916. Later that month, he transferred to Feldflieger Abteilung 10, to fly single-seated Fokker fighters. He came under the command of Kurt Student. Pfeiffer shot down a Caudron on 6 August 1916. Four days later, he received the Iron Cross First Class as a consequence. On 24 August, 2 and 26 September, he shot down a Caudron apiece. On 7 October, Feldflieger Abteilung 10 morphed into Jagdstaffel 9. Pfeiffer continued to shoot down enemy planes, tallying seven more between 10 November 1916 and 14 May 1917. During this stretch, he also received two decorations from his native Baden, as well as being commissioned on 21 November 1916.

On 20 May 1917, Hermann Pfeiffer died during the test flight of a captured Nieuport fighter.

Sources of information

References

 Above the Lines: The Aces and Fighter Units of the German Air Service, Naval Air Service and Flanders Marine Corps 1914 - 1918 Norman L. R. Franks, et al. Grub Street, 1993. , .

 Early German Aces of World War I. Greg VanWyngarden, Harry Dempsey. Osprey Publishing, 2006. , .

1890 births
1917 deaths
People from Konstanz (district)
People from the Grand Duchy of Baden
Prussian Army personnel
Military personnel of the Grand Duchy of Baden
Luftstreitkräfte personnel
Recipients of the Iron Cross (1914), 1st class
German military personnel killed in World War I
Aviators killed in aviation accidents or incidents
Victims of aviation accidents or incidents in 1917
Military personnel from Baden-Württemberg